Annularops is a genus of land snails with an operculum, terrestrial gastropod mollusks in the family Pomatiidae.

Species 
Species within the genus Annularops include:
Annularops attenuata (Torre & Bartsch, 1941)
Annularops blaini (Gundlach in Pfeiffer, 1863)
Annularops coronadoi (Arango in Poey, 1867)
Annularops perplexa (Torre & Bartsch, 1941)
Annularops sauvallei (Gundlach in Bartsch, 1863)
Annularops semicana (Morelet, 1851)
Annularops tryoni (Arango, 1879)
Annularops vannostrandi (Arango, 1876)

References 

Pomatiidae